K. R. Aravindakshan (died 27 September 2017) was an Indian communist leader from Kerala, India. He was born in Kottayam.

He was the General secretary of Communist Marxist Party. He died on 27 September 2017.

References

1950s births
2017 deaths
Communist Marxist Party politicians
People from Kottayam district